Requiem pour un poisson (Requiem for a Fish) is a 2005 novel by French author Christine Adamo.

Plot

The coelacanth is a very strange fish. On the one hand, this ancient species might have been the missing link between land and sea. On the other hand, everybody thought that it had disappeared long before the dinosaurs' extinction. Yet, one day in 1938, a South African fisherman catches a specimen in his nets. But is the fish really the famous coelacanth? The world of science gets passionate and jealous around the beast. Who will be the first to trace the origins of mankind?  Stealing, cheating, lying... murdering? And Why is Marie, this young pregnant Parisian, suddenly caught up in this story?

Between Africa and the Comoro Islands, the Comoro Islands and Sulawesi, London and Paris, the world of ichthyology turns  into a gripping thriller.

Release details
2005, France, Liana Levi, Pub date 7 January 2005
2006, France, Folio policier (Gallimard), Pub date 4 April 2006
2006, Netherlands ("Requiem vor een vis"), De Geus, Pub date 2006
2007, Italy ("Requiem per il Celacanto"), Effemme Edizioni, Pub date 2007

2005 French novels
French crime novels

Crime novels